Franz Schädler (born 3 February 1968) is a former Liechtenstein football midfielder.

Making his debut against Latvia in 1995, Schädler would go on to win 12 caps and score one goal for his country. He last played at the club level for FC Balzers.

References

Liechtenstein international footballers
FC Balzers players
Liechtenstein footballers
1968 births
Living people
Association football midfielders